Henrik Lachmann (1738–1797) was a Norwegian civil servant and politician.  He served as the County Governor of Stavanger county from 1762 until 1768. He then served as the County Governor of Smaalenenes amt from 1768 until 1781.

References

1738 births
1797 deaths
County governors of Norway